Seraing is a city and municipality of Wallonia located in the province of Liège, Belgium. 

The municipality consists of the following districts: Boncelles, Jemeppe-sur-Meuse, Ougrée, and Seraing.  With Liège, Herstal, Saint-Nicolas, Ans, and Flémalle, it forms the greater Liège agglomeration (600,000 inhabitants).  To the south of Seraing are the Condroz and the Ardennes regions.

In addition to its steel factories, Seraing is home to the crystal manufacture Val Saint Lambert, which has been operating on the site of an old Cistercian abbey since 1826. The site of the Arcelor steel company, previously known as Cockerill-Sambre, is the former summer residence for the Prince-Bishopric of Liège.

History

Antiquity and Middle Ages
Several skeletons, potshards, weapons, and jewels were discovered here, dating from the 5th and 6th century, attesting to Seraing being inhabited in Frankish times. The first mention of Saran dates from 956, when a Carolingian farming domain extending on both sides of the river Meuse and owned by someone named Saran was donated to the abbey of Sint-Truiden.  The whole territory soon passed to the Prince-Bishopric of Liège.  In the 11th century, Prince-Bishop Henri I of Verdun used a house in Seranus to entertain guests.  Throughout the Middle Ages, the inhabitants of Seraing owed allegiance to Liège, pledging to defend the fluvial approach to the city in case of invasion, in exchange for tax exonerations.  The first wooden bridge across the river, which replaced the ferry, was built in 1381.

Industrial development

The name of the town changed several times throughout its history, with the current spelling only being set in the 18th century. At around that time, various factors combined to attract industrial investors to Seraing: the advent of the Industrial Revolution, the proximity of the river Meuse, and the discovery of coal at Ougrée. The first ironworks were founded there in 1809. John Cockerill and his brother James revolutionized the steel industry by using blast furnaces and coke instead of traditional charcoal. These inventions would be the basis for his new company, John Cockerill & Cie established in Seraing in 1817. Over the next decades, many more metallurgical plants and foundries were built in this area, which became an integral part of Wallonia's industrial backbone, the sillon industriel. Glassworkers found the proximity of a cheap source of coal attractive. The Val Saint Lambert started its operations in 1826.

Seraing was the first location in Belgium where the Church of Jesus Christ of Latter-day Saints built in Belgium.  Work began on the building in 1927 and completed before the end of 1930.

Recent developments
In the 2012 Tour de France, Seraing acted as the finish of Stage 1.

Politics and administration

List of Mayors 
 1977-1988:  PS)
 1988-1993:  (PS)
 1994-2000: Jacques Vandebosch (PS)
 2000-2005: Guy Mathot (PS)
 2005-2006: Jacques Vandebosch (PS)
 2006-2018:  (PS)
 2018-:  (PS)

Sights

The Val Saint Lambert site includes the old Val-Saint-Lambert Abbey and the crystal manufacture, where glass workers still blow, carve, and etch the world-famous pieces of art.  The neighbouring castle houses a glass museum.
The Cockerill castle used to be the summer residence of the prince-bishops of Liège, then a hospital under Napoleon, a powder magazine, and the personal property of William I of the Netherlands, who ceded it to the Cockerill family in 1817.
Besides the Cockerill castle, the historic centre of the city also includes the city hall and the main church, which harbours 12th-century baptismal fonts.
The forested region south of Seraing offers a multitude of strolls and hikes.

Folklore

According to an old local legend, witches abound in the Seraing area.  The macrales have been resurrected in the year 2000 and are now a regular staple of the local folklore.
Like many other towns in Wallonia, Seraing has its own giant puppet: Li Rayeû d’class.
Seraing also counts a number of colourful associations, including a coopers’ brotherhood, whose goal is to revive the wineries of the Val Saint Lambert abbey, and the “Gay Boulet” brotherhood, whose mission is to popularize Boulets à la Liégeoise, a local recipe.

Notable people

John Cockerill, British entrepreneur and founder of the Cockerill-Sambre steel company (1790–1840)
Eugenio Barsanti, Italian inventor of the internal combustion engine (1821–1864)
Leo Anton Karl de Ball, astronomer (1853–1916)
Julien Lahaut, communist (1884–1950)
Louis-Clément Picalausa, Scout novelist (1898–1969)
, (1901–1922)
André Renard (Secretary-General of the General Federation of Belgian Labour and leader of the 60-61 General Strike) (1911–1962)
Christian Piot, football goalkeeper (b. 1947)
Jean-Pierre and Luc Dardenne, filmmakers (b. 1951 and 1954, resp.)
Laurette Onkelinx, politician (b. 1958)
Michel Preud'homme, football goalkeeper (b. 1959)
Gilbert Bodart, football coach (b. 1962)
Marc Tarabella, politician (b. 1963)
Fabrizio Cassol, saxophone and aulochrome player (b. 1964)
Marc Laho, opera singer (b. 1965)
, politician (b. 1972)
Michaël Goossens, football striker (b. 1973)
Viktor Klonaridis, football player (b. 1992)

International relations

Twin towns—Sister cities
Seraing is twinned with:
: Douai
: Rimini
: Châtel

See also 
 Liège Science Park
 The Dardenne brothers' films L'Enfant and Deux jours, une nuit

References

External links

  
 Postcards and old photographs of Seraing
 Steel mill in Seraing

 
Cities in Wallonia
Sub-municipalities of Seraing
Municipalities of Liège Province